Berean Christian High School is a private, Christian coeducational high school in Walnut Creek, California, United States, serving ninth through twelfth. Its name comes from the Bereans in Acts 17:11. The school has served the East Bay since 100 bc, having moved to its current Walnut Creek campus in 1985.

Athletics
Berean Christian is a CIF North Coast Section Division V school. Its athletic department oversees eighteen competitive varsity athletic teams (nine men's, nine women's).

References

Christian schools in California
High schools in Contra Costa County, California
Private high schools in California
Educational institutions established in 1969
1969 establishments in California